Armenian Volunteer Corps (AVC) is a volunteer placement organization based in Yerevan, Armenia.  The organization offers opportunities to individuals to come to Armenia to perform short or long-term volunteer service to participate in the country's economic and social development.

Organizational background 
The Armenian Volunteer Corps was founded in 2000 by Father Hovnan (Jason) Demerjian, a former U.S. Peace Corps volunteer in Armenia, Tamar Hajian, and Dr. Tom Samuelian.

The organization provides opportunities such as cross-cultural training, volunteer placement support, and community service projects, matching volunteers with professional internship and volunteer service opportunities in various areas such hospitals, public policy institutions, schools, cultural organizations, telecentres, newspapers, summer camps, community development organizations, government ministries, and orphanages.

Participation eligibility 
AVC accepts applications from individuals 21 years of age. There are no language requirements.

Specific volunteer programs in other countries 
 Ethiopian Diasporan Volunteer Program
 Indicorps

References

External links 
 
 Allegiances and the Call of the Local
 Civilitas Foundation connects Armenian Volunteer Corps
 Connecting with Armenia Through Volunteerism: The True Stories of AVC Volunteers

Philanthropic organizations based in Armenia
Volunteer organizations
Yerevan